A Man with Heart is a 1932 German drama film directed by Géza von Bolváry and starring Gustav Fröhlich, Maria Matray, and Gustav Waldau.

Cast

References

Bibliography

External links 
 

1932 films
German drama films
1932 drama films
1930s German-language films
Films directed by Géza von Bolváry
Bavaria Film films
German black-and-white films
Films scored by Robert Stolz
1930s German films